Davao may refer to:

Cities and metropolitan areas
Davao City, an independent highly urbanized city in the Davao Region of Mindanao island, Philippines
Metro Davao, the metropolitan area centered on Davao City

Regions and provinces
Davao (province) (1914–1967), a defunct/former province in the Philippines
Davao Region, an administrative region in the Philippines succeeding the former Davao province, containing the present provinces of:
Davao de Oro
Davao del Norte
Davao del Sur
Davao Occidental
Davao Oriental

Hubs of transportation
Francisco Bangoy International Airport (DVO), Davao City's main airport
Port of Davao, Davao City's main seaport

Water bodies
Davao Gulf, Mindanao, Philippines
Davao River, Mindanao, Philippines

See also
Danao, Cebu
Danao, Bohol